Fuad Alasgarov  (Azerbaijani: Fuad Murtuz oğlu Ələsgərov; May 14, 1959), also spelled as Fuad Aleskerov, is the Assistant to the President for Work with Law Enforcement Bodies and Military Issues, Head of Department and has the rank of first degree state adviser.

Early life and Career 
Fuad Alasgarov was born on 14 May 1959 in Baku. He graduated from secondary school (No. 20) with Gold Medal in Baku, and entered Azerbaijan State University (predecessor of Baku State University) Law faculty and graduated the same faculty with Honors in 1981 .

Between the years of 1981 – 1984, he worked as an advisor in the Department of a Notary and the Registry office at the Ministry of Justice of the Republic of Azerbaijan. In 1984, he worked as an advisor in the Department of Judicial Authorities of the same ministry.

Till to 1987, he worked as head advisor in the Department of Supervision and Inspection of Execution at the Ministry of Justice. During 1987 -1990, he worked as a Judge at People's Court in Surakhani district of Baku city and as the member of the Supreme Court of the Republic of Azerbaijan between 1990 – 1994.

He was appointed as the Head of State-Law Department of the Presidential Administration of the Republic of Azerbaijan in 1994 with the Presidential Order. Later on he was appointed as the Head of Work with Law Enforcement Bodies of thePresidential Administration in 1998 and carried out this post till to 2017.

On 31 May 2017, he was appointed as the Assistant to the President on Work with Law Enforcement Bodies and Military Issues and Head of Department on Work with Law Enforcement Bodies and Military Issues of the Presidential Administration.

He is also member of several state commissions and collegial bodies. Currently he serves as the member of the Commission on Combating Corruption of the Republic of Azerbaijan, Judicial-Legal Council of the Republic of Azerbaijan, Commission on Pardon Issues under the President of the Republic of Azerbaijan and Commission on Citizenship Issues under the President of the Republic of Azerbaijan.

Memberships 
Fuad Alasgarov is a member of several state commissions and collegial bodies including:

1.     State Commission of Azerbaijan on Combatting Drug Abuse and Illicit drug Trafficking

2.     State Commission on Reforms in Public Administration System of Azerbaijan

3.     Commission on Citizenship Issues under the President of Azerbaijan

4.     Commission on Combating Corruption of Azerbaijan

5.     Judicial-Legal Council of Azerbaijan

6.     State Commission of Azerbaijan on cooperation with European Union

7.     Pardon Issues Commission under the President of Azerbaijan

8.     Central Expert Commission on Documentation Expertise and Archive Work at the Presidential Administration of Azerbaijan

Awards 
He is awarded with “Honored lawyer” for his services given to the development of legislation of the Republic of Azerbaijan with Presidential Order dated on 22 June 2010.

Family 
He is the oldest son of the Professor Dr. Murtuz Alasgarov who served as the Speaker of the National Assembly of Azerbaijan from 1996 to 2005.

See also 
 Presidential Administration of Azerbaijan
 Commission on Combating Corruption of the Republic of Azerbaijan

References 

1959 births
Living people
Azerbaijani politicians
Political office-holders in Azerbaijan
New Azerbaijan Party politicians